The 2015 IIHF World Championship Division II was an international Ice hockey tournament run by the International Ice Hockey Federation. Group A was contested in Reykjavík, Iceland, and Group B in Cape Town, South Africa, with both groups being played 13 to 19 April 2015.

Venues

Division II A

Participants

Match officials
4 referees and 7 linesmen were selected for the tournament.

Referees
 Roy Hansen
 Vedran Krčelić
 Paweł Meszyński
 Liam Sewell

Linesmen
 Maksims Bogdanovs
 Thomas Caillot
 Havar Dahl
 Sindri Gunnarsson
 Michael Johnstone
 Marko Sakovic
 Orri Sigmarsson

Standings

Results
All times are local (UTC±0).

Awards and statistics

Awards
Best players selected by the directorate:
 Best Goaltender:  Arthur Legrand
 Best Defenceman:  Attila Góga
 Best Forward:  Björn Sigurðarson
Source: IIHF.com

Scoring leaders
List shows the top skaters sorted by points, then goals.

GP = Games played; G = Goals; A = Assists; Pts = Points; +/− = Plus/minus; PIM = Penalties in minutes; POS = Position
Source: IIHF.com

Goaltending leaders
Only the top five goaltenders, based on save percentage, who have played at least 40% of their team's minutes, are included in this list.

TOI = Time on ice (minutes:seconds); SA = Shots against; GA = Goals against; GAA = Goals against average; Sv% = Save percentage; SO = Shutouts
Source: IIHF.com

Division II B

Participants

Match officials
4 referees and 7 linesmen were selected for the tournament.

Referees
 Manuel Nikolic
 Tomáš Orolin
 Alexey Roshchyn
 Andrej Simankov

Linesman
 Jonathan Burger
 Christoffer Hurtik
 Benas Jakšys
 Vytautas Lukoševičius
 Marco Mori
 Park Jun-soo
 Marc-Henri Progin

Standings

Results
All times are local (UTC+2).

Awards and statistics

Awards
Best players selected by the directorate:
 Best Goaltender:  Dimitar Dimitrov
 Best Defenceman:  Daniel Spivak
 Best Forward:  Héctor Majul
Source: IIHF.com

Scoring leaders
List shows the top skaters sorted by points, then goals.

GP = Games played; G = Goals; A = Assists; Pts = Points; +/− = Plus/minus; PIM = Penalties in minutes; POS = Position
Source: IIHF.com

Goaltending leaders
Only the top five goaltenders, based on save percentage, who have played at least 40% of their team's minutes, are included in this list.

TOI = Time on ice (minutes:seconds); SA = Shots against; GA = Goals against; GAA = Goals against average; Sv% = Save percentage; SO = Shutouts
Source: IIHF.com

References

IIHF World Championship Division II
3
2015 IIHF World Championship Division II
2015 IIHF World Championship Division II
2015 IIHF World Championship Division II
2015 IIHF World Championship Division II
2015 in South African ice hockey
2014–15 in Icelandic ice hockey
April 2015 sports events in Europe
2010s in Reykjavík
2010s in Cape Town
April 2015 sports events in Africa